Pablo Vainstein (born 18 July 1989) is an Argentine handball player for Ciudad Encantada and the Argentina men's national handball team.

He defended Argentina in the men's 2016 Rio Summer Olympics handball tournament.

References

External links
Handball - Olympics: Day 2 Photo of Vainstein

1989 births
Living people
Argentine male handball players
Olympic handball players of Argentina
Handball players at the 2016 Summer Olympics
Expatriate handball players
Argentine expatriate sportspeople in Spain
Liga ASOBAL players
South American Games silver medalists for Argentina
South American Games medalists in handball
Competitors at the 2018 South American Games
Handball players at the 2019 Pan American Games
Pan American Games medalists in handball
Pan American Games gold medalists for Argentina
Medalists at the 2019 Pan American Games
Handball players at the 2020 Summer Olympics
21st-century Argentine people